Charles "Charlie" Swanson (born February 20, 1998) is an American swimmer. He won the gold medal in the men's 400 metre individual medley event at the 2019 Pan American Games held in Lima, Peru.

References

External links 
 
 
 Charles Swanson at the 2019 Pan American Games

1998 births
Living people
Sportspeople from Richmond, Virginia
American male medley swimmers
Pan American Games gold medalists for the United States
Pan American Games medalists in swimming
Swimmers at the 2019 Pan American Games
Medalists at the 2019 Pan American Games
Michigan Wolverines men's swimmers
St. Christopher's School (Richmond, Virginia) alumni
21st-century American people